Elsebach (in its upper course, upstream from the Lollenbach, also: Reingser Bach) is a small river of North Rhine-Westphalia, Germany. Its source is north of Oestrich (a district of Iserlohn). Near Reingsen, it is joined by its left tributary Lollenbach. It empties into the Ruhr near Schwerte.

The open air bath "Elsebad" is named after the creek which was used in the past to provide water for the bath.

See also
List of rivers of North Rhine-Westphalia

References

External links 
 Openstreetmap
Biologische Station im Kreis Unna (German)

Rivers of North Rhine-Westphalia
Rivers of Germany